Patrick is a sportswear company headquartered in Oudenaarde, East Flanders, Belgium.

History
1892 - 1894: Start and official registration of the shoe factory of Eugene Bénéteau 

Eugene Bénéteau was a 19th-century shoemaker in the little town Pouzauges in the French Vendée. In 1892, he started his own shoe and leather factory, the predecessor to what would later become Patrick. In 1894, the registration of his factory became official. 
 
1929: Patrice Bénéteau follows in the footsteps of his father Eugene

In the 1920s, Eugene’s son Patrice took over the factory and started making shoes for the local soccer team. He did such a fine job that the word spread fast and other teams came knocking at his door. Not much later, Patrice also started producing shoes and apparel for basketball, running, cricket, athletics, cycling and leisure. In 1929, he was one of the first to start sponsoring famous sportspeople – a strategy that would become the foundation for the brand’s exceptional growth. Patrice changes the name of the factory to “Manufacture de chaussures sports Patrice Bénéteau”.

1932: The birth of the two stripes

In the 1930s, Patrick introduced its famous two and three stripes on the shoes to technically strengthen them in the front and at the back. Patrick was one of the pioneers to use this widely copied technique. Later, the striping became mainly a matter of design, but the two Patrick stripes were there to stay as part of Patrick’s brand identity.
      
1945: “Patrice” becomes “Patrick” 

In 1945, Patrice changed the name of his sports brand to Patrick. The new name was receptive to all languages and allowed the brand to be promoted and exported worldwide.

1950: Invention of the revolutionary “plastfix” sole

Patrick’s exclusive “plastfix” sole was a revolution at the time. Lightness and resistance were the key factors that made this sole a winner. But not only the sole opened the way for setting new records in Patrick’s sports shoes. Patrick’s “monobloc” mounting system made the footwear completely waterproof and shape retaining. These Patrick shoes were made by skilled craftsmen selected among the best.

1951: Roger Piantoni (soccer)

In the 1950s, Patrick sponsored Roger Piantoni, a former French soccer player that played for FC Nancy, Stade de Reims and OGC Nice. With Stade de Reims, he became champion of France in 1958, 1960 and 1962. Piantoni also became a top scorer in the “Ligue 1” two times (1951, 1961).

1960: Robert Poulain (rugby)

The national rugby monitor for Patrick France was Robert Poulain, who tested the functionality and durability of Patrick’s rugby collection. For years, he was the reference for quality footwear in rugby. He helped to develop a line of Poulain junior and senior footwear and elevated the game through research and progressive adjustments to these shoes. 

1961: Raymond Poulidor and Jaques Anquetil (cycling)

During the sixties, Patrick had two cyclists on its team: Jacques Anquetil and Raymond Poulidor. Anquetil was also known as “Monsieur Chrono”, a nickname he achieved by winning a lot of time trials. His name became even more legendary after winning the Tour de France 5 times. Poulidor was a popular sportsman among the French people who named him “Pou Pou”. As an eternal second, he always came a little short to catch the first prize. In 1961, he became a French cycling champion.

1976: Flemming Delfs (badminton)

Flemming Delfs is especially noteworthy for winning the men's singles at the first IBF World Championship held in Malmö (Sweden) in 1977. Delfs won three consecutive European men's singles titles in 1976, 1978 and 1980. He played on all four Danish Thomas Cup (men's international) teams between 1972 and 1982, two of which reached the championship rounds.

1978: Bernard Hinault (cycling)

Following Anquetil’s footsteps, Patrick’s Bernard Hinault won the Tour de France five times in ’78, ’79, ’81, ’82 and ’85. This resulted in his own signature model.

1979: Kevin Keegan (soccer)

Kevin “King” Keegan was one of the most remarkable players on the Patrick soccer team. Starting his career in 1968, he starred in the English Pro League, where he ended as a coach in September 2008. He played in the English national team, where he managed to score 21 goals in 63 international matches. Pélé chose him to be part of the 100 best soccer players in the world.

1983: Michel Platini (soccer)

Michel François Platini is a French former football player, manager and administrator. Nicknamed “Le Roi” (the king) for his ability and leadership, he is regarded as one of the greatest footballers of all time. Platini won the Ballon d'Or three times, in 1983, 1984 and 1985, and ended sixth in the FIFA Player of the Century vote. In recognition of his achievements, he was named Chevalier of the Legion of Honour in 1985 and became Officier in 1988.

1984: Jahangir khan (squash)

In squash, there was only one true champion in the ‘80s: Jahangir Khan. He won the world championship no less than eight times.

1986: Brian and Michael Laudrup (soccer)

During his playing career, Michael Laudrup won league titles with Ajax, Barcelona, Real Madrid and Juventus, playing as an attacking midfielder. As a world-class playmaker, he was a member of Johan Cruyff's "dream team" at Barcelona. There, he won nine trophies, including four successive La Liga titles from 1991 to 1994 and the European Cup in 1992. Laudrup moved to archrivals Real Madrid in 1994, with whom he won his fifth La Liga title in a row.

1987: Jean-Pierre Papin (soccer)

Jean-Pierre Papin achieved his greatest success while playing for Olympique Marseille between 1986 and 1992. He later played for A.C. Milan, FC Bayern Munich, Bordeaux, Guingamp, JS Saint-Pierroise and US Cap-Ferret. Papin also played for the French national team 54 times. After a short time as a manager of French clubs, he started playing in the local amateur club AS Facture-Biganos Boïen in 2009 at the age of 45. 

2008: Patrick becomes a part of Cortina

In 2008, Patrick became a part of the family-owned company Cortina, one of the fastest-growing global fashion footwear and apparel companies in today’s industry. A heritage collection was launched that reproduced several models out of Patrick’s rich history in a limited edition. 

2009: Patrick becomes the official partner of the referees’ associations in Belgium 

Frank De Bleeckere, a famous Belgian football referee, collaborated with Patrick in 2009 to promote a shoe especially for referees. Since then, Patrick is the official supplier of the referees’ associations in Belgium and many other leagues.

Products
Patrick manufactures sports shoes, apparel and teamwear.

Sponsorships
Teams that wear (or have worn) uniforms by Patrick includes:

Football

Clubs teams

Africa
  USM El Harrach

Europe
   Oudenaarde
   White Star Woluwe
   Zulte Waregem
   US Boulogne
   Mulhouse
   SC Toulon
   Rot-Weiß Oberhausen.
   Chrobry Głogów
   Zagłębie Sosnowiec

North and Central America
  Tauro 
  Victoria

Oceania
   Excelsior
   Mataiea

Referees
Patrick is also the official referee kits supplier for the leagues:

  Belgian First Division A
  Belgian First Division B                 
  Belgian National Division 1
  Belgian Division 2 VFV
  Belgian Division 2 ACFF
  Belgian Division 3 VFV
  Belgian Division 3 ACFF

Former club teams

 Bolton Wanderers
 West Bromwich Albion
 Hull City
 Cambridge United
 Sunderland AFC
 Southampton FC
 Plymouth Argyle F.C.
 Clermont 
 EA Guingamp Season 2014-2015
 Wrexham AFC
.Newport County A.F.C
.Sparta Rotterdam
.NEC Nijmegen
.Royal Excel Mouscron
.Royal Knokke F.C.

References

External links
 
 Official UK & Europe website

Sportswear brands
Sporting goods manufacturers of Belgium
Clothing companies established in 1892
Belgian brands